Mob City is an American neo-noir crime drama television series created by Frank Darabont for TNT. It is based on real-life accounts of the L.A.P.D. and gangsters in 1940s Los Angeles as chronicled in John Buntin's book L.A. Noir: The Struggle for the Soul of America's Most Seductive City. The series premiered on December 4, 2013.

On February 10, 2014, TNT canceled the series after one season. In Germany the series was released via polyband on DVD and Regional lockout-free Blu-ray on July 2, 2015, however there are no known plans to release the series on home video in the U.S.

Synopsis
Mob City is based on a true story of a conflict that lasted decades between the Los Angeles Police Department (under leadership of police chief William Parker), and ruthless criminal elements led by Bugsy Siegel, who was in charge of the Los Angeles mafia operations. The series is a crime drama set in Los Angeles during 1947, with brief visits to the 1920s to show background information. The so-called noir period in L.A. was a time of flashy cars, newly minted movie stars and new beginnings; it was also a time of lies and corruption. Half of the LAPD was run by mafia families with money and there were huge loopholes in the system, which the mob exploited.

Cast and characters

Main
 Jon Bernthal as LAPD Detective Joe Teague, a former US Marine Corps Master Gunnery Sergeant and Guadalcanal Campaign veteran caught in the conflict between Parker and Cohen
 Milo Ventimiglia as Ned Stax, a lawyer and fixer for Cohen, who also fought alongside Teague in the war
 Neal McDonough as William Parker, a captain in the LAPD bent on taking down the mob
 Alexa Davalos as Jasmine Fontaine, a beautiful woman working as a photographer at Cohen's nightclub
 Jeffrey DeMunn as Hal Morrison, the detective at the head of the LAPD's new mob squad
 Andrew Rothenberg as Eddy Sanderson, a member of Morrison's mob squad and a friend of Joe's
 Robert Knepper as Sid Rothman, a mobster working closely with Cohen and Siegel; based on Cohen's hitman Harold "Harry" Rothman
 Jeremy Luke as Mickey Cohen, the most dangerous mobster in Los Angeles
 Gregory Itzin as Fletcher Bowron, the mayor of Los Angeles
 Edward Burns as Bugsy Siegel, one of the most infamous mobsters in Los Angeles

Recurring
 Dana Gould as Tug Purcell, a member of Morrison's mob squad
John Pollono as Pat Dolan, a member of Morrison's mob squad and Mike's partner 
 Daniel Roebuck as Nick Bledsoe, a member of Morrison's mob squad and Tug's partner
 Richard Brake as Terry Mandel, Rothman's right hand man
 Iddo Goldberg as Leslie Shermer, a man involved in Hecky's blackmail
 Mike Hagerty as Fat Jack Bray, an older member of Morrison's mob squad
 Michael McGrady as Clemence B Horrall, the chief of the LAPD
 Gordon Clapp as Carl Steckler, a former employee of Cohen's
 Jeremy Strong as Mike Hendry, a member of Morrison's mob squad that butts heads with Joe
 Paul Ben-Victor as Jack Dragna, a mobster and rival of Cohen's
 Mekia Cox as Anya, the head bartender at one of Bunny's bars
 James Hebert as Miles Hewitt, a lieutenant in the LAPD

Guest stars
 Simon Pegg as Hecky Nash, a comic with blackmail against the mob
 Ernie Hudson as Bunny, a mobster who owns nightclubs across Central Avenue
 Patrick Fischler as Meyer Lansky, a mobster and an associate of Siegel

Production

Development
The project was first announced in January 2012, under the title L.A. Noir. When asked about details concerning the show, Darabont said various cultures, such as those of African-Americans and Hispanics, would likely be explored, and he was interested in expanding upon already touched upon aspects from Buntin's book. Darabont also commented on the general nature of his project, explaining he wanted to avoid its coming off as a docudrama while still staying true to the book, part of the way to doing that required inserting fictional characters into the timeline. The series was picked up for six episodes in October 2012.

In January 2013, the title was changed to Lost Angels, as the original title was considered too similar to that of the video game L.A. Noire. In August 2013, the title was changed again to Mob City.

Casting
Jon Bernthal was the first to be officially cast; after one month of negotiations he was officially cast as the lead. Following after him were Milo Ventimiglia, Jeremy Strong, Neal McDonough, and in a guest role Simon Pegg. Alexa Davalos was cast as the female lead after which two more cast members were announced, Jeffrey DeMunn and Andrew Rothenberg. Both of the latter previously worked with Bernthal and Darabont in The Walking Dead. Following the six episode order Pihla Viitala (who was later replaced by Mekia Cox) and Gregory Itzin were confirmed to star. Thomas Jane, who starred in Darabont's film The Mist, was in talks to join the show in the role of famous mobster Bugsy Siegel. Edward Burns was later cast in the role of Siegel, instead of Jane. Jeremy Luke was confirmed to be playing the legendary mobster Mickey Cohen in June 2013. Robert Knepper confirmed that he had been cast in a recurring role in the series, but at the time his role was unknown. Before filming of the rest of the series began Knepper was promoted to a series regular, as Sid Rothman, a mobster working for Cohen. Ernie Hudson was cast in a recurring role as a mobster nicknamed "Bunny", in June 2013.

Filming
According to guest star Simon Pegg, filming for the pilot began on May 10, 2012, and wrapped shortly after sunset on May 25, 2012. The rest of the series started filming in June 2013 and ended in late August of the same year.  While the pilot was shot on 35mm film, the balance of the series was shot digitally.  Darabont, a proponent of film who described himself as "one of the last holdouts", was sufficiently impressed with the approximation to film that digital had come to be able to accomplish.

Changes were made to the original pilot due to the lengthy timespan between production and the series proper as well as to better establish series regulars.  A new prologue from prohibition era New York was conceived introducing the characters of Bugsy Siegel, Sid Rothman, and Meyer Lansky which becomes contextualized in the finale.  The pilot originally began with a flashback introducing young Mickey Cohen and William Parker; this was moved to the second episode.  A new scene at a church which introduced the character of Leslie Shermer and further expanded Sid Rothman's role was also incorporated into the premiere.  Some characters from the pilot were also recast: Gregory Itzin replaced Ron Rifkin as the mayor of Los Angeles, and Mekia Cox replaced Pihla Viitala as Bunny's Jungle Club bartender Anya.  A production still from the pilot featuring Viitala was used prominently in the show's online marketing despite her absence in the show.

Episodes

Reception

Critical response
Mob City received generally positive reviews from critics. On Rotten Tomatoes, the series has a rating of 66% based on 47 reviews, with an average rating of 6.43/10. The website's critical consensus reads: "Frank Darabont's love letter to classic noir, Mob City is like a gorgeous gangster moll; its facade feels a bit too familiar, but everything's in the right place and it's stunning to look at." On Metacritic, the series has a weighted average score of 63 out of 100, based on 34 critics, indicating "generally favorable reviews".

Accolades

Legacy
Though the show did not find commercial success, TNT chief Michael Wright defended the decision to greenlight the series in a 2014 interview, commenting that "Mob City was a chance. It didn’t draw the audience, but I’d do it again tomorrow."

In 2015, TNT premiered another serialized, period crime drama, Public Morals, which was developed by Mob City recurring actor Edward Burns.  Burns was partially inspired by the positive relationship that Darabont had with TNT on Mob City to do the project with the network. The series shares other actors with Mob City, including Neal McDonough and Robert Knepper.

See also 
 Gangster Squad (LAPD)—a real-life unit of the LAPD

References

External links
 
 

2010s American crime drama television series
2010s American police procedural television series
2013 American television series debuts
2013 American television series endings
Television series about organized crime
Television series set in the 1940s
Television shows set in Los Angeles
TNT (American TV network) original programming
Works by Frank Darabont
Cultural depictions of Meyer Lansky
Cultural depictions of Bugsy Siegel
Neo-noir television series
Works about Jewish-American organized crime
Works about the American Mafia